Kadir Nurman (c.1933 – 24 October 2013) was a Turkish restaurateur, widely credited with having in 1972, in West Berlin, introduced or "invented" the fast food sandwich commonly known as the "kebab", consisting of traditional Turkish döner kebab meat stuffed together with mixed salad into a flatbread. Nurman received a lifetime achievement award from the Association of Turkish Döner Manufacturers in 2011. Afterwards, Nurman told the German magazine Frankfurter Rundschau that he was unhappy with modern döner kebab sandwiches, as "there are too many ingredients" in them.

Several people have been credited with being the "inventor of the döner kebab" in Germany, but such claimsincluding that for Nurmanare widely considered inaccurate. The familiar rotating döner kebab meat, roasted on a vertical spit and sliced with a sword, has been well known in Turkey since the mid-19th century. Its invention is attributed to the town of Bursa, and often credited to İskender Efendi; though it has also been ascribed to a cook named Hamdi, decades earlier in Kastamonu.

Introduced in Nurman's native Istanbul in the 1940s by restaurateurs such as Beyti Güler, it became a world-famous delicacy. Döner kebab has been sold in sandwich form there since at least the mid-1960s. The Greek gyro, was already a popular sandwich item in Athens and in New York City by 1971. Nurman himself did not claim to be the first person to have sold a sandwich of döner kebab meat even in Germany, saying in German: "Maybe someone else also did it, in some hidden corner, but no one noticed. The kebab became well-known through me."

Nevertheless, Nurman's prototypical kebab shop at West Berlin's busy central train station was a harbinger of a global trend, and his early version of the staple street snack was the framework upon which Berlin's Turkish Gastarbeiter immigrant community developed the distinctive style that has become one of the top-selling fast foods in Germany and much of Europe, and has spread around the world.

Life 
Nurman was born in Istanbul, Turkey. He emigrated to Germany from Turkey in 1960, aged 26, and moved to Berlin from Stuttgart in 1966. In 1972 he set up a fast food stall at Berlin's Berlin Zoologischer Garten railway station, in what was then West Berlin. At his stall Nurman sold grilled meat and salad inside a flat bread. He had thought that busy Berlin workers might like a portable meal. Though he did not become wealthy from his widely imitated shop, Nurman later said he was happy that so many Turkish people were able to make a living selling kebabs. At the time of his death, there were approximately 16,000 döner outlets in Germany, with over 2.5 billion euros ($3.3 billion) in annual sales.

References

1933 births
2013 deaths
Turkish chefs
Turkish restaurateurs
Turkish emigrants to West Germany
Businesspeople from Istanbul
Businesspeople from Berlin